Rivula concinna is a moth of the family Erebidae first described by Thomas Pennington Lucas in 1895. It is found in Australia in Queensland, Western Australia and the Northern Territory.

References

"Species Rivula concinna (T. P. Lucas, 1895)". Australian Faunal Directory. Archived 9 October 2012.

Moths of Australia
Hypeninae
Moths described in 1895